Xylota bistriata is a species of hoverfly in the family Syrphidae.

Distribution
India, Thailand, Vietnam.

References

Eristalinae
Insects described in 1915
Taxa named by Enrico Adelelmo Brunetti
Diptera of Asia